Def Jam: Fight for NY is a hip hop-influenced action video game published by EA Games (unlike the original, which was published under the EA Sports BIG brand). It was released on September 20, 2004 for PlayStation 2, Xbox, and GameCube. It is a sequel to Def Jam Vendetta and is followed by Def Jam: Icon.  The game features several rappers, including Lil' Kim, Snoop Dogg, Method Man, Redman, Fat Joe, Mobb Deep, Ice-T, Xzibit, N.O.R.E, Ludacris, Crazy Legs and Busta Rhymes, Flavor Flav, Sean Paul as well as the voices and likeness of other celebrities, such as Henry Rollins, Christopher Judge, Carmen Electra, Bubba Sparxxx and Kimora Lee Simmons. The only artists from the original game that did not appear in the sequel were DMX, Keith Murray, Christina Milian and Funkmaster Flex. The game was spun off into a 2006 PlayStation Portable game called Def Jam Fight for NY: The Takeover.

Gameplay
The gameplay is expanded from the original game, which was primarily a wrestling game.  Fighters can choose one, two, or three of five fighting styles. The fighting styles are Streetfighting, Kickboxing, Martial Arts, Wrestling and Submissions.

Additionally, Def Jam Fight for NY emphasizes the use of the game's various environments and the surrounding crowd to cause damage. Tossing the opponent against barriers gives fighters an opportunity to inflict massive damage to their opponent by slamming them into the wall headfirst, ramming a door or gate in their face, or using other features of the environment. The crowd will shove a fighter back into combat if he is thrown into them or gets too close, sometimes holding a fighter and leaving them open to attack. Some spectators carry weapons, and will offer them to the fighters, or even attack a fighter if they are held by a nearby onlooker.

Momentum is gained by successfully performing moves, countering, and taunting the opponent. The rate at which momentum is gained is affected by the fighter's Charisma stat, which like other stats varies between fighters. Created fighters can set their own charisma with a combination of clothes, tattoos, and jewelry; the more expensive, the better. A fighter with a good set of clothes, extensive tattoos, or laden with jewellery can often fill their momentum meter in just a few moves.

When the momentum meter is full, a fighter can activate it, which results in a Blazin' Taunt. In this state, the fighter is said to be "Blazin", and can pull off a Blazin' Move, a powerful and brutal attack personalized for each character. A created character can learn every single Blazin' Move in the game, but can only have up to four usable at any one time.

Though the game focuses on mixed fighting styles, the only way to win a fight is through Knock Out or Submission. A character can be made to submit by putting them into submission holds until the health bar of a single body part is depleted.

Knock Out is achieved through a unique health bar used in the game. Health is composed of two bars, the first bar representing a fighter's consciousness and ability to fight (Displayed as an opaque light green), while underneath it is the fighter's physical wellness bar (Displayed as a semi transparent dark green). With every hit, a fighter's consciousness will fall quicker than his/her physical wellness. However, whenever a fighter is not losing health, their consciousness meter will recover up to the maximum current physical wellness. When a fighter's consciousness is lowered to a very low point, the entire health bar will turn red. This indicates that the fighter is in danger of being knocked out. Knocking out an opponent in danger requires the use of strong hits, Blazin' Moves, and environmental moves such as slamming an opponent into the wall, or achieving a double team move with a crowd member, or using a weapon (like a pipe, a bottle, a wooden bat, a shovel, etc.). It is possible to knock out an opponent by beating down their health while their physical wellness remains very high. As a fight wears on, physical wellness will eventually fall low enough that when a fighter's consciousness recovers to the physical limit, it is still too low to turn green. This is sometimes known as permanent danger, meaning a fighter is permanently in danger of being knocked out.

Additionally, each fighting style has a unique way to knock out opponents in danger: streetfighters can attack with a strong punch; wrestlers can perform a strong grapple; kickboxers can complete a kick-combo; submission experts can force the enemy to submit with grapples; and martial artists can perform flying attacks.

Story Mode
The game's story mode follows the narrative of an unknown, player-created fighter, who is fighting his way through the New York Underground. Winning matches rewards the player with cash, which can be used in shops to buy clothes which include famous clothes lines such as Reebok, Phat Farm, Air Jordan, Sean John and many other clothing lines. As well as clothes, the fighter can get haircuts, tattoos, and jewelry from Jacob "The Jeweler" Arabo, as well as Development points, which can be used at the local gym, run by Henry Rollins, to increase the character's skills, or to purchase and set up new Blazin' Moves and up to two additional fighting styles.

Winning matches also unlocks clubs and the fighters defeated, as well as their Blazin' Move, and often the jewelry they may wear. Created characters can have the jewelry of Sean Paul, Crack (Fat Joe), Xzibit, Crazy Legs, Lil' Flip, Def Jam Recordings, Roc-A-Fella Records, State Property, and many others (except for some particular signature pieces such as the medallions worn by Flavor Flav or modify it like Ghostface Killah's Sun God Plate Gold and Diamond piece), the fighters may be used in Battle Mode, while their moves and jewelry may be purchased and used by the player.

Characters
The game features 67 playable characters, including real-life hip hop artists signed to Def Jam at the time, as well as original characters.

Story

The game takes place immediately after Def Jam Vendetta. D-Mob (Chris Judge) is arrested by NYPD cops Starks and Jervis and placed in the back of their cop car when an SUV hits it, causing it to flip over on its back. D-Mob crawls out of the wreckage and boards the SUV as Jervis catches a glimpse of the suspect before passing out. He later describes his appearance to Lauren. The suspect becomes the game's protagonist, named The Hero.
 
At his house, Blaze (Method Man) and Sticky Fingaz are playing video games. Praising The Hero for rescuing him, D-Mob tells Blaze and Sticky that he's in but the duo wants to see him fight. After defeating House, Blaze becomes impressed but Sticky is unimpressed. D-Mob then gives the Hero money to start fresh and begins scheduling fights for him. Wanted by the cops, Blaze gives The Hero a safehouse to stay in hiding. The Hero then begins to defeat numerous fighters, gaining notoriety after defeating O.E. (Omar Epps). O.E.'s defeat impresses D-Mob's fighter Ludacris. After The Hero defeats a fighter from The Limit, Blaze tells him that four female fighters are interested in him (Cindy J, Kimora Lee, Lil' Kim and Shawnna). When The Hero approaches one of them, their boyfriend Nyne attacks him. Depending on who wins, the Hero can take his girlfriend or Shaniqua becomes his girlfriend. After winning a match against Ice-T, The Hero and D-Mob  are greeted by Crow (Snoop Dogg), and his henchmen: Magic, Crack, and Trejo. Warning D-Mob that Club 357 will be under his control, Crow announces he's accepting fighters in return for more cash. The announcement causes D-Mob to lose some of his clubs and several of his fighters siding with Crow, like WC.

Returning to The Limit and Babylon to defeat Crow's fighters, Carmen Electra takes notice of The Hero. When the one approaches the other, the girlfriend becomes jealous and engages Electra to a fight. The winner becomes The Hero's girlfriend with mixed results. At a meeting with D-Mob, Blaze, Ludacris, N.O.R.E., The Hero, and Sticky, they agree to fight Crow's fighters to win back their clubs. D-Mob then arranges a match for Blaze to go up against Crack, but Blaze loses. Defeating many of Crow's fighters, The Hero then defeats WC at The Red Room. Celebrating their victory, Crow proposes a winner-take-all match between Crack and D-Mob's "best man". D-Mob accepts and picks The Hero. Infuriated he wasn't chosen, Sticky storms off and later joins Crow. The Hero defeats Crack at Club Murder, Crow, along with Crack, WC and Prodigy, leaves the arena angrily as The Hero, Blaze, and D-Mob celebrate in his limousine. As D-Mob gives The Hero a pendant and welcomes him into the family, Crow's gang attempt a drive-by shooting, causing the cars to crash, and make their escape into the 125th Street Subway Station. As D-Mob and Blaze remain in the wreckage, The Hero chases down the trio as Magic and Sticky, boards a subway which leaves the station. Trejo is out of bullets and gets in a fight with The Hero; with Trejo potentially being thrown in front of a train. Returning to the limo, The Hero tries to get D-Mob out of the wreckage but D-Mob tells him and Blaze to leave as he is too injured and the cops arrive at the scene.

Blaze takes D-Mob's place and tells The Hero to continue fighting Crow's fighters to win more clubs as Doc, waking up, joins in. Along with Ludacris, the trio takes control of the Terror Dome, the Syn Energy Power Plant, 7th Heaven, Hunt's Point Scrap Yard, and the Foundation. Arriving at the Chopshop, a team tournament sponsored by The Source is being held where the winning team wins a large amount of money and a customized Cadillac Escalade. After Magic approaches The Hero's girlfriend, he enters the tournament and picks either Ice-T or O.E. as his partner. Reaching the final round, the team faces Magic and the partner The Hero didn't choose as his partner and defeats them. The Hero continues to rack up wins and chips away at Crow's empire. Throughout the story, Crow threatens The Hero to leave his clubs alone while also trying to both get The Hero to join his side and/or threatens him, but fails; at one point sending Magic to threaten The Hero in a parking lot after a cage fight at the Gauntlet. Crow, with some help from Sticky and Magic, resorts to kidnapping The Hero's girlfriend and forcing him to retake all the clubs he has earned for D-Mob's side, an apparent betrayal that angers D-Mob's crew. Crow warns The Hero that if he tells anyone the real reason for his change of sides, his girlfriend will die.

With the last club won in a fight against Doc, before which a distraught Blaze angrily takes D-Mob's pendant from The Hero, Crow claims to have one final task for the player. The scene is moved to an empty scrapyard, where the player finds Blaze brutally beaten by Magic, the final task being to finish him off. The Hero refuses, and knocks out WC. He and Blaze then beat up Crack and Magic. Interrogating them, the Hero finds out where his girlfriend is being held, and that Crow never planned on letting her live. He and Blaze rush over to an abandoned factory, where Sticky is about to set the entire building on fire. The Hero fights Sticky and leaves him to die in the burning building. After he wins the fight, he can be seen taking his girlfriend out of the building before it collapses. She remains unconscious as The Hero tries to shake her awake, and enrages The Hero enough to confront Crow.

The Hero and Blaze confront Crow at his headquarters, backed up by Crack and WC, whose respect they earned, and the remainder of D-Mob's crew, whom Blaze had cleared The Hero's good name with. As a rumble breaks out with the crews, The Hero rushes to Crow's penthouse in a final confrontation. After a brief stand off involving a gun, given to The Hero by a repentant Magic, he decides that Crow is not worth killing. However, an enraged Crow attacks him with a knife hidden in his cane, the ensuing fight results in The Hero throwing Crow out a window, plummeting to his death. Having cleared his reputation and overthrown Crow, The Hero then takes a minute to reflect as Blaze gives him back his pendant.

GameCube version
There are features exclusive to PS2 and Xbox that are missing from the GameCube version.  The player is restricted to having one voice for the main character - as opposed to the six found in other versions. Eight of the 28 available music tracks are missing. The GameCube's hardware lacks the light blur effect that permeates on the characters and arenas. Furthermore, certain 3 or 4 player arenas have reduced crowds due to the minidisc space limitations.

Development
Josh Holmes, the producer from EA Canada wanted to improve on the already well received Def Jam Vendetta. The research they've done shows that veteran gamers were familiar with the game control system yet new players were intimidated by the complexity that's been used since WCW vs. nWo: World Tour that first appeared on the N64. The team decided to simplify the controls and make them more intuitive: "We found that straight one-on-one fighting tended to get stale over time, no matter how polished the fighting engine was". The team added secondary elements like crowds, weapons and interactive environments for the player to use as a weapon. Lastly, Holmes went on to say that individual players prefer to use their own tactics, so different classes has been implemented in unique ways to achieve a KO: "The overall focus of the fighting system is fun, over-the-top action rather than a simulation of technical fighting".

Also the create-a-fighter mode, a feature lacking in Def Jam Vendetta, has been incorporated into the sequel as a part of the Story Mode. Holmes explains that with other successful fighting games, the convention of a sequel is to add complexity to the control system, multiplayer focus to the exclusion of all else, shallow single player, limited character customization and having a gameplay that's skewed towards the hardcore gamer: "Probably the most common that's typical in fighting games like the first game is that it's empty and devoid of people. Inevitably, there's nothing going on except it's just you and your opponent. So they turned the concept on its head by filling the gap to make the fighting game more interactive and less predictable in order to keep it fresh and accessible for beginners and veterans alike".

Reception

The game received largely positive reviews. GameSpot and IGN gave it a score of 8.7 out of 10 and GameSpy and X-Play gave it a score of 4 out of 5. GameSpots Alex Navarro praised the game for improving nearly every aspect from its predecessor, including the new fighting styles, character creation, and interaction with weapons and environments. Criticism generally befell on the game's camera view and frame rate issues that are found in all console versions. Additionally reviewers mentioned that the game is laden with a lot of profanity, though it works within the context of the game.  Aside from the frame rate, reviewers praised the game's graphics, with both IGN and GameSpot calling them "impressive". GameSpot later named it the best GameCube game of September 2004. It received runner-up positions in GameSpot's 2004 "Best Fighting Game" and "Best Licensed Music" award categories across all platforms.

Maxim gave it a score of eight out of ten and said: "Should the lyrically challenged feel left out, you can create your own brawler outfitted in ice courtesy of celebrity bling supplier Jacob the Jeweler. Better to look good than to—ow—feel good". The Sydney Morning Herald also gave the game four stars out of five and said that "the fact that it's got the deepest story ever seen in a fighter simply adds to the realistic feel of the brutal combat within".

References

External links
 Official website
 

2004 video games
Cancelled Game Boy Advance games
Def Jam video games
GameCube games
Video games based on musicians
Organized crime video games
PlayStation 2 games
Syn Sophia games
Fighting games
Video games developed in Canada
Video games developed in Japan
Video game sequels
Video games set in New York City
Xbox games
Professional wrestling games
Multiplayer and single-player video games
Video games based on real people